("Street Fighting") refers to urban guerrilla actions carried out by Basque nationalist youth who are integrated into the abertzale left. Along with ETA, the kale borroka was the only remaining armed faction of Basque nationalists in the Basque Conflict.

Their most common actions included: attacking offices of political parties, especially the Spanish Socialist Workers' Party and People's Party, but also other parties such as Basque Nationalist Party and Navarrese People's Union; attacking the property of people linked to these groups (burning cars, attacking housing); attacking and destroying ATMs, bank offices, public transport; and rioting using molotov cocktails, burning trash containers and even private vehicles in demonstrations, etc.

During ETA's ceasefire from March 2006 to 2007, the  did not cease to act, but its activities have been decreasing since it peaked in the mid-1990s.

External links 

 Guardia Civil  (Spanish language)
 M.L.G.F. filed story (Spanish language)

Basque nationalism
Basque politics
Crime in Spain
Political riots
20th-century riots
21st-century riots